Nkam is a department of Littoral Province in Cameroon. The department covers an area of 6,291 km and as of 2001 had a total population of 66,979. The capital of the department lies at Yabassi.

Subdivisions
The department is divided administratively into 4 communes and in turn into villages.

Communes 
 Ndobian
 Nkondjock
 Yabassi
 Yingui

References

Departments of Cameroon
Littoral Region (Cameroon)